East Gippsland Commonwealth Marine Reserve is a 4,137 km2 marine protected area within Australian waters located in the Tasman Sea near the New South Wales-Victoria border. The reserve was established in 2007 and is part of the South-east Commonwealth Marine Reserve Network.

The reserve includes both warm and temperate waters, with the East Australian Current bringing subtropical water from the north, forming large eddies around Cape Howe. The complex mix of warmer and cooler waters and the seasonality of currents creates conditions for highly productive phytoplankton growth, which supports an abundance of marine life.

Protection
The entirety of the East Gippsland marine reserve area is IUCN protected area category VI and zoned as 'Multiple Use'.

See also

Commonwealth marine reserves
Protected areas of Australia
Pacific Ocean

Notes

References

External links
East Gippsland Commonwealth Marine Reserve Network website

South-east Commonwealth Marine Reserves Network
Protected areas established in 2007
East Gippsland